Coleophora cristata is a moth of the family Coleophoridae that can be found in Russian Far East, and in eastern Zhejiang, province of China.

References

External links

cristata
Moths of Asia
Moths described in 1989